is a Japanese politician from the Liberal Democratic Party. As of 2014 he has served as member of the House of Councillors for the Miyagi at-large district.

References

1975 births
Living people
People from Sendai
Members of the House of Councillors (Japan)
Liberal Democratic Party (Japan) politicians
21st-century Japanese politicians